Temporal are an Australian metal band from Perth. The band formed in late 2010 through brothers Anthony and Stephen Santoro and guitarist Urvin Seeburuth. No longer Active 

After a few lineup changes resulting in the addition of Scott Mcmullen (vocals) and Michael Barr (bass) the band recorded their debut release "Persecution" with Singaporean producer Roland Lim (Make Them Suffer, Birds of Tokyo, Dyscord).

The single was released on 1 March 2012, receiving positive reviews and peaking at #22 on the Triple J Unearthed Charts.

The band recorded their EP Exitium with Roland Lim during September 2012. The album was officially released through Bandcamp on 6 December. The EP peaked at number 5 on the Australian Metal Charts on iTunes.

Members
Current members
 Scott Mcmullen - vocals
 Anthony Santoro - guitar
 Urvin Seeburuth - guitar
 Michael Barr - bass guitar
 Stephen Santoro - drums

Additional Personnel
Roland Lim - Producer

References

Australian heavy metal musical groups